Daniel Graßmück (born 8 January 1987) is an Austrian badminton player.

Achievements

BWF International Challenge/Series 
Men's doubles

  BWF International Challenge tournament
  BWF International Series tournament
  BWF Future Series tournament

References

External links 
 

Living people
Austrian male badminton players
1987 births